Grămești is a commune located in Suceava County, Western Moldavia, Romania. It is composed of five villages: Bălinești, Botoșanița Mică, Grămești, Rudești and Verbia.

References

Communes in Suceava County
Localities in Western Moldavia